Zwyssig is a Swiss surname. Notable people with the surname include:

 Alberich Zwyssig (1808–1854), Swiss Cistercian monk and composer
 Marco Zwyssig (born 1971), Swiss footballer

Swiss-German surnames